Amen Thompson (born January 30, 2003) is an American professional basketball player for the City Reapers of Overtime Elite (OTE). He played basketball for Pine Crest School in Fort Lauderdale, Florida, where he was rated a five-star recruit by ESPN and won a state title. Thompson bypassed his senior year of high school to sign with OTE, where he played for two seasons.

Early life
Thompson was born to Maya Wilson and Troy Thompson and raised in San Leandro, California. His identical twin brother, Ausar, is an NBA prospect, and his older brother, Troy Jr., played college basketball for Prairie View A&M. His uncle, Mark Thompson, represented Jamaica in 400 meter hurdles at the 1992 Summer Olympics. He and Ausar began training for basketball under the guidance of their father by age seven and drew inspiration from LeBron James. The twins were homeschooled in sixth and seventh grade to focus on basketball.

High school career
Entering eighth grade, Thompson and his family moved to Fort Lauderdale, Florida so that he and Ausar could play high school basketball one year early at Pine Crest School. The twins immediately started for the team. As a sophomore at Pine Crest, Thompson averaged 16.9 points, 7.3 rebounds and 3.7 assists per game, earning All-County honorable mention. Entering his junior season, he was named to the Broward County Fab Five by the Sun-Sentinel. He averaged 20.5 points, 8.4 rebounds and 4.4 assists per game as a junior, leading his team to the Class 4A state championship in a 90–83 double overtime win over Santa Fe High School. In the title game, Thompson scored 43 points and helped Pine Crest overcome an eight-point deficit with 45 seconds left in overtime. He shared Broward County Class 5A-1A co-player of the year honors from the Sun-Sentinel with Ausar.

Recruiting
Thompson was considered a five-star recruit by ESPN and a four-star recruit by Rivals. He gained interest from college programs in 2019, receiving a scholarship offer from Alabama. After his junior year, Thompson held offers from Alabama, Arizona, Auburn, Arizona State and Kansas, among other programs, before deciding to not play college basketball.

Professional career

Team OTE (2021–2022) 
On May 25, 2021, Thompson signed a two-year contract with Overtime Elite (OTE), a new professional league based in Atlanta with players between ages 16 and 20. He joined the league with Ausar, bypassing his final year of high school and college, because he felt that it would prepare him best for the NBA. In the 2021–22 season, Thompson played for Team OTE, one of three teams in the league, and averaged 14 points, 6.6 rebounds, 3.8 assists and 2.1 steals per game. He competed against other OTE teams, as well as prep school and postgraduate opponents. He helped his team achieve a runner-up finish, scoring 13 points in a 52–45 loss to Team Elite in the decisive third game of the finals. Thompson played for OTE affiliate Team Overtime in The Basketball Tournament in July 2022. His team lost to Omaha Blue Crew, 74–70, in the first round of the tournament.

City Reapers (2022–present) 
In the 2022–23 OTE season, Thompson played for the City Reapers alongside team captain Ausar, who selected him with the first pick in the league's draft. On January 9, 2023, Thompson was named OTE Player of the Week for his first time, three days after recording 22 points, 10 rebounds, seven assists and five steals in a 101–90 win over the Cold Hearts. At the end of the regular season, he was named to the All-OTE First Team.

The City Reapers reached the OTE Finals, where they faced the YNG Dreamerz. In Game 2 of the Finals, Thompson scored a buzzer-beating, game-winning layup in an 80–78 win that gave the City Reapers a 2–0 series lead. The City Reapers eventually won the Finals in Game 3, giving them a 3–0 series victory.

References

External links
Overtime Elite profile

Living people
Guards (basketball)
Basketball players from California
2003 births
Pine Crest School alumni
People from San Leandro, California